The Day of Remembrance for Truth and Justice is a public holiday in Argentina, commemorating the victims of the Dirty War. It is held on 24 March, the anniversary of the coup d'état of 1976 that brought the National Reorganization Process to power.

The commemoration was sanctioned as Law 25633 by the Argentine National Congress on 1 August 2002, and promulgated by the Executive Branch on 22 August of the same year. However, it was not implemented as a public national holiday until 2006. The 30th anniversary of the coup was marked by massive demonstrations.

See also

 Dirty War
 Operation Condor
 National Commission on the Disappearance of Persons
 National Archive for Memory

References

External links
Education Ministry commemorative webpage  

March observances
Public holidays in Argentina
Remembrance days
Autumn events in Argentina